Mamontovsky District is an administrative and municipal district (raion), one of the fifty-nine in Altai Krai, Russia. It is located in the center of the krai. Its administrative center is the rural locality (a selo) of Mamontovo. As of the 2010 Census, the total population of the district was 23,412, with the population of Mamontovo accounting for 37.5% of that number.

References

Notes

Sources

Districts of Altai Krai
States and territories established in 1924